XHPNS-FM is a radio station on 107.1 FM in Piedras Negras, Coahuila, Mexico. It is owned by Grupo Zócalo and carries the Exa FM pop format from MVS Radio.

History
XHPNS received its concession on November 30, 1994 and signed on November 1, 1996. It was initially owned by Luis Javier Núñez Vigil but has been under Zócalo control for its entire history.

On September 20, 2019, the station flipped from romantic "Amor 107" to Exa FM, bringing the format back to Piedras Negras after XHRE-FM came under Radiorama management.

References

Radio stations in Coahuila
Radio stations established in 1996
1996 establishments in Mexico